The men's 4×100 metre freestyle relay at the 2007 World Aquatics Championships took place on 25 March 2007 at the Rod Laver Arena in Melbourne, Australia. The top-12 finishers from this race qualified for the event at the 2008 Olympics. 35 teams entered in the event, of which 34 swam.

The existing records when the event started were:
World record (WR): 3:12.46, USA (Phelps, Walker, Jones, Lezak), 19 August 2006 in Victoria, Canada.
Championship record (CR): 3:13.77, USA (Phelps, Walker, Dusing, Lezak), Montreal 2005 (24 July 2005)

Results

Final

Heats

See also
Swimming at the 2005 World Aquatics Championships – Men's 4 × 100 metre freestyle relay
Swimming at the 2008 Summer Olympics – Men's 4 × 100 metre freestyle relay
Swimming at the 2009 World Aquatics Championships – Men's 4 × 100 metre freestyle relay

References

Men's 4x100m Freestyle Relay Heats results from the 2007 World Championships. Published by OmegaTiming.com (official timer of the '07 Worlds); retrieved 2009-07-11.
Men's 4x100m Freestyle Relay Final results from the 2007 World Championships. Published by OmegaTiming.com (official timer of the '07 Worlds); retrieved 2009-07-11.

Swimming at the 2007 World Aquatics Championships